Joseph Ellicott Historic District is a local historic district in Buffalo, New York. It is in the vicinity of Niagara Square, which was designed by Joseph Ellicott as the centerpiece of the city's street plan in 1805.

History
The district was founded on November 30, 1982, by the Buffalo Preservation Board. It is bordered to the North by West Mohawk Street, to the East by Franklin Street, to the South by Swan Street, and to the West by Elmwood Avenue.

Sahlen Field encroached on the southern border of the district when it was built in 1988, although the Buffalo Preservation Board approved the venue's construction after the architecture was designed to match the neighboring Ellicott Square Building and Old Post Office.

Notable extant buildings
Notable buildings include:

 68 Court Street – Michael J. Dillon Memorial United States Courthouse (1936) by Edward Brodhead Green
 107 Delaware Avenue – Statler Hotel (1923) by George B. Post and Sons
 121 Ellicott Street – Old Post Office (1897) by James Knox Taylor
 50 Franklin Street – St. Joseph Cathedral (1863) by Patrick Keely
 100 Franklin Street – County and City Hall (1872) by Andrew Jackson Warner
 237 Main Street – Marine Midland Trust Company Building (1913) by Green & Wicks
 283 Main Street – Ellicott Square Building (1896) by Daniel Burnham
 284 Main Street – Fidelity Trust Building (1909) by Green & Wicks
 65 Niagara Square – Buffalo City Hall (1930) by Dietel, Wade & Jones
 140 Pearl Street – Prudential Building (1896) by Louis H. Sullivan and Dankmar Adler

Gallery

References

Historic districts in Buffalo, New York